In Greek mythology, Ismene (Ismēnē) was the naiad daughter of the river-god Asopus by the nymph Metope, daughter of the river Ladon. She was the sister of Aegina, Salamis, Pelagon (Pelasgus) and Ismenus. Ismene was the wife of Argus, eponymous king of Argos and thus, mother of Argus Panoptes and Iasus.

Note

References

 Apollodorus, The Library with an English Translation by Sir James George Frazer, F.B.A., F.R.S. in 2 Volumes, Cambridge, MA, Harvard University Press; London, William Heinemann Ltd. 1921. ISBN 0-674-99135-4. Online version at the Perseus Digital Library. Greek text available from the same website.
 Diodorus Siculus, The Library of History translated by Charles Henry Oldfather. Twelve volumes. Loeb Classical Library. Cambridge, Massachusetts: Harvard University Press; London: William Heinemann, Ltd. 1989. Vol. 3. Books 4.59–8. Online version at Bill Thayer's Web Site
 Diodorus Siculus, Bibliotheca Historica. Vol 1-2. Immanel Bekker. Ludwig Dindorf. Friedrich Vogel. in aedibus B. G. Teubneri. Leipzig. 1888-1890. Greek text available at the Perseus Digital Library.

Naiads
Nymphs
Children of Asopus